Geir Isene (born October 23, 1966) is a Norwegian writer, business consultant, coach and critic of the Church of Scientology .

Isene left the Church of Scientology in 2009 after having been a member for 25 years. His turning point came in 2006, shortly after having reached the uppermost spiritual level within the church, Operating Thetan (OT) 8, when he met the leader, David Miscavige.

He released the autobiography, 1984, My journey into the deepest secrets of Scientology - and getting out again on September 18, 2013, where he reveals details about the secret OT levels. Isene is the only person having reached OT 8 who has released a book detailing his journey into and out of Scientology.

Isene is known as an Open Source advocate, a public speaker, coach and blogger.

References

External links 
 Geir Isene's blog

1966 births
Living people